The fat skink (Lygosoma corpulentum) is a species of skink found in Vietnam, Thailand, and Laos.

References

Lygosoma
Reptiles described in 1921
Taxa named by Malcolm Arthur Smith
Reptiles of Cambodia
Reptiles of Laos
Reptiles of Thailand